City is an electoral ward within the City of Bradford Metropolitan District Council.

City covers the centre of Bradford within the inner ring road and the areas of Shearbridge, Lister Hills, Brown Royd, Dirk Hill, Little Horton Green and part of Lidget Green all to the west of the commercial centre.

It is part of the Bradford West parliamentary constituency.

Councillors 
The ward is represented on Bradford Council by three Labour Party councillors, Nazam Azam, Shakeela Lal and Aneela Ahmed.

 indicates seat up for re-election.
 indicates councillor defection.

References

Wards of Bradford